QN or qn may refer to:
 Qn, one of several robust measures of scale in statistics
 ATCvet code QN Nervous system, a section of the Anatomical Therapeutic Chemical Classification System for veterinary medicinal products
 QN connector, a type of coaxial RF connector
 Queen's Nurse (QN), an honorary title awarded by the Queen's Nursing Institute (QNI) to community nurses
 Queen regnant (Qn.), in the Christian Church, following the name of a Christian saint who was a Queen
 Queer Nation (QN), a United States LGBT social movement
 Quintillion (qn), a large number